Christina Theune (formerly Theune-Meyer; born 4 November 1953) is a German graduate sports teacher, and the former national coach of the German women's national football team.

Biography
Theune was born into a sporting family. Her father was a track and field athlete, and her mother played handball.

Career

She played from 1974 until 1986 for Grün-Weiß Brauweiler, where she was also later player-manager.

After she completed her teacher training, she became the first woman in Germany to acquire the DFB Fußball-Lehrer (coach) licence in 1985, which is equivalent to the UEFA Pro license.

In 1986 she became assistant coach to the women's national team, and succeeded Gero Bisanz as national coach on 1 August 1996 after the Summer Olympics in Atlanta. In total she won six European championships, three as an assistant to Gero Bisanz, three as national coach, and led the German women's team to victory in the 2003 Women's World Cup. After winning the UEFA Women's Championship in 2005, she retired from the position of national coach, as had already been announced, handing over to her assistant Silvia Neid.

Personal life
Theune married Thomas Meyer, who coached her as a player. After marriage, she adopted the surname "Theune-Meyer" until her divorce in 2008.

Honours

Manager
Germany
Summer Olympic Games: bronze medal 2000, bronze medal 2004
FIFA Women's World Cup: 2003
UEFA Women's Championship: 1997, 2001, 2005

References

External links
  Official page of the German women's national team
  Tina Theune - weltfussball.de

1953 births
Living people
People from Kleve
Sportspeople from Düsseldorf (region)
German women's footballers
Germany women's national football team managers
1999 FIFA Women's World Cup managers
2003 FIFA Women's World Cup managers
FIFA Women's World Cup-winning managers
German women's football managers
UEFA Women's Championship-winning managers
Women's association football midfielders
Footballers from North Rhine-Westphalia
Female association football managers